Stenophis is a genus of Madagascan arboreal snakes, part of the family Lamprophiidae. Species of Stenophis typically have large heads relative to their body size, and their bodies are elongated and often thin. The genus includes both viviparous and oviparous species. They usually have prolate pupils.

Taxonomy
Stenophis was previously considered to be part of the genus Lycodryas until the mid-1990s.

A phylogenetic analysis in 2008 found that the genus is polyphyletic, and a 2010 study proposed three monophyletic genera of the snakes currently in Stenophis and Lycodryas: Lycodryas (with Stenophis as a junior synonym), Phisalixella, and Parastenophis.

Species
Known species of Stenophis include:

Stenophis arctifasciatus (A.M.C. Duméril, Bibron & A.H.A. Duméril, 1854) = Phisalixella arctifasciata (A.M.C. Duméril, Bibron & A.H.A. Duméril, 1854)
Stenophis betsileanus (Günther, 1880) = Parastenophis betsileanus (Günther, 1880)
Stenophis carleti Domergue, 1995 = Lycodryas carleti (Domergue, 1995)
Stenophis citrinus Domergue, 1995 = Lycodryas citrinus (Domergue, 1995)
Stenophis gaimardi (Schlegel, 1837) = Lycodryas gaimardi (Schlegel, 1837)
Stenophis granuliceps (Boettger, 1877) = Lycodryas granuliceps (Boettger, 1877)
Stenophis guentheri Boulenger, 1896 = Lycodryas guentheri (Boulenger, 1896)
Stenophis iarakaensis Domergue, 1995 = Phisalixella iarakaensis (Domergue, 1995)
Stenophis inopinae Domergue, 1995 = Lycodryas inopinae (Domergue, 1995)
Stenophis inornatus Boulenger, 1896 = Lycodryas inornatus (Boulenger, 1896)
Stenophis jaosoloa Domergue, 1995 = (is a junior synonym of ) Phisalixella arctifasciata (A.M.C. Duméril, Bibron & A.H.A. Duméril, 1854)
Stenophis pseudogranuliceps Domergue, 1995 = Lycodryas pseudogranuliceps (Domergue, 1995)
Stenophis tulearensis Domergue, 1995 = Phisalixella tulearensis (Domergue, 1995)
Stenophis variabilis Boulenger, 1896 = Phisalixella variabilis (Boulenger, 1896)

Nota bene: A binomial authority in parentheses indicates that the species was originally described in a different genus.

References

Further reading
Boulenger GA. 1896. Catalogue of the Snakes in the British Museum (Natural History). Volume III., Containing the Colubridæ (Opisthoglyphæ and Proteroglyphæ) ... London: Trustees of the British Museum (Natural History). (Taylor and Francis, printers). xiv + 727 pp. + Plates I-XXV. (Stenophis, new genus, pp. 39–40 + Plate IV).

Colubrids
Reptiles of Madagascar
Snakes of Africa